Park West may refer to:

Locations
 Central Park West, New York City, a street 
 Park West, Dublin, a business park
 Park West and Cherry Orchard railway station, Dublin 
 Park West (Miami), a neighborhood 
 Park West (music venue) in Chicago, Illinois
 ParkWest, a ski resort and music venue in Park City, Utah, now known as Canyons Resort

Businesses
 Park West Gallery, Southfield, Michigan, an art gallery

See also
 West Park (disambiguation)